Omar Al-Sohaymi  (born 17 January 1993) is a Saudi professional footballer who currently plays as a midfielder for Al-Batin.

Career
On 20 July 2022, Al-Sohaymi joined on a one-year deal, with an option to extend for another year, from Al-Ain.

Honours
Abha
MS League: 2018–19

References

 

1993 births
Living people
Saudi Arabian footballers
Al Nassr FC players
Vitória S.C. players
Louletano D.C. players
Al-Faisaly FC players
Al-Tai FC players
Abha Club players
Al-Ain FC (Saudi Arabia) players
Al Batin FC players
Expatriate footballers in Portugal
Saudi Arabian expatriate sportspeople in Portugal
Saudi Arabian expatriate footballers
Saudi First Division League players
Saudi Professional League players
Association football midfielders